HKCS may refer to:
 Hong Kong Computer Society
 Hong Kong Correctional Services